Pine Manor is a census-designated place (CDP) located off U.S. Route 41 (South Cleveland Ave) and Summerlin Road in Lee County, Florida, United States. The population was 4,122 at the 2020 census, up from 3,428 at the 2010 census. It is part of the Cape Coral-Fort Myers, Florida Metropolitan Statistical Area.

Geography
Pine Manor is located in central Lee County at  (26.571853, -81.877732). It is bordered to the north by the city of Fort Myers, and by unincorporated Whiskey Creek to the west and Villas to the south. US 41 forms the eastern boundary of the community; the highway leads north  to the center of Fort Myers and south  to Estero.

Demographics

References

Census-designated places in Lee County, Florida
Census-designated places in Florida